Robert James Robertson (June 18, 1917 – January 17, 2009) was an American football player who played one season with the Brooklyn Dodgers of the National Football League (NFL). He was drafted by the Brooklyn Dodgers with the seventh overall pick in the 1942 NFL Draft. He played college football at the University of Southern California and attended Omaha Central High School in Omaha, Nebraska. Robertson was a member of the USC Trojans 1939 national championship team. He served in the United States Navy during World War II.

References

External links
Just Sports Stats

1917 births
2009 deaths
Players of American football from South Dakota
American football halfbacks
Saint Mary's Gaels football players
USC Trojans football players
Brooklyn Dodgers (NFL) players
United States Navy personnel of World War II
People from Pine Ridge, South Dakota
Omaha Central High School alumni